Grégory "Cheetah" Choplin (born 15 November 1980 in Saint-Denis) is a French-Ivorian Middleweight and Super Middleweight Muay Thai kickboxer.

Choplin currently fights out of DEREK boxing in la Courneuve. He is from Saint-Denis, Paris, France.  He is a two-time Muay Thai world champion who has had several title fights within the It's Showtime organization and is widely thought of as one of the top kickboxers in France.

Career
After winning titles at youth and amateur level, Choplin would he would turn professional at the age of 20 and won his first professional title, the French Class A championship, a few years later in 2004.  The same year he was selected to represent France at the amateur world Muaythai championships in Bangkok, Thailand, reaching the semi finals and claiming a bronze medal.

Between 2001 and 2006 Choplin would be virtually unbeatable at home, having defeated top domestic talent such as Frank Nadje and Yohan Lidon.  In order to seek greater challenges, Gregory started to compete outside France where his growing reputation got him a world title shot against Vincent Vielvoye in 2006.  Despite having beating Vielvoye a few months early (albeit with some controversy) Choplin was seen as the underdog in the battle for the W.P.K.L. belt.  After four rounds, however, Gregory was the new champion, defeating the home fighter in front of a partisan Dutch crowd via technical knockout.

In 2007, Choplin would sign a professional contract with the It's Showtime organization, becoming the first and (so far) only Frenchman to sign a contract with the Dutch kickboxing giants.  Signing with the organization meant Gregory would face the best fighters in Europe on a regular basis.  That year he also won a second world title, defeating Jan de Keyzer in Santander to become the W.F.C.A. champion.  In 2008 he would participate as a wildcard entry in the bi-annual It's Showtime 75MAX trophy, reaching the final where he lost to Dmitry Shakuta.  He was also selected as a contestant for the It's Showtime Reality Show, reaching the semi final stage only to lose to Brazilian Muay Thai supremo Cosmo Alexandre via a devastating knee KO after an extra round in what was an exciting fight.

Gregory bounced back from his recent setups by picking up a number of useful domestic wins against Cédric Muller and Yohan Lidon as well as winning several fights within the It's Showtime organization throughout 2008 and the start of 2009.  These results got Choplin a rematch against previous conqueror Dmitry Shakuta for Dmitry's It's Showtime 77MAX title.  Choplin was unable to gain revenge for his earlier loss in his failed bid for the title in Budapest, losing a hard five round contest.  Throughout 2010 Gregory focused on the domestic scene picking up a good win against top local fighter Moussa Konate.  In 2011 Choplin fought in America for the first time, being on the wrong end of an upset when he lost against Ky Hollenbeck - the winner getting a shot at Choplin's old foe Yohan Lidon for the W.B.C. Muaythai world title.

He faced Joe Valtellini at Lion Fight 7 in Las Vegas on October 13, 2012 and won via decision.

Choplin lost to Yodsanklai Fairtex by way of third-round KO at Lion Fight 8 in Las Vegas, Nevada, USA on January 25, 2013.

He bounced back with a points win over Gil Silva at Le Choc des Légendes 2013 in Paris, France, on March 9, 2013.

He was scheduled to fight Duochonlek at the WBC World Muay Thai Millennium Championship in Saint-Pierre, Réunion on September 7, 2013 but the card fell through.

He defeated Marco Piqué via UD in the main event of Lion Fight 14 in Las Vegas, Nevada, United States on March 28, 2014.

He faced Hichem Menaouine at Golden fight 3 in La Courneuve on June 06, 2015 for the W.M.C (World Muaythai Council) title and won via decision. 

Choplin defeated Ramon Kübler by TKO(Cut) at 2R on April 14, 2016 at Espace Venise in Sarcelles, Val-d'Oise, France. He retained his WBC Muaythai World title

Titles

Professional
2016 WBC Muay Thai world champion Super Middleweight -168 lb
2015 WMC World Muaythai Council World champion -168 lbs
2013 WBC Muay Thai World Super Middleweight (168 lbs) champion
2011 IKF Intercontinental Middleweight Champion
2008 It's Showtime 75MAX Trophy runner up
2007 W.F.C.A. Thai-boxing world champion -76.2 kg
2006 W.P.K.L. Muaythai world champion -76 kg
2004 French Muaythai Class A national champion

Amateur
2004 I.F.M.A. World Muaythai Championships in Bangkok, Thailand  -75 kg

Professional kickboxing record

|-  style="background:#cfc;"
| 2016-04-14 || Win ||align=left| Ramon Kubler || soirée Boxe anglaise et Muaythai || Sarcelles, France || TKO (cut) || 2 || 2:55
|-
! style="background:white" colspan=9 | 
|-  style="background:#cfc;"
| 2015-06-06 || Win ||align=left| Hichem Menaouine || Golden Fight 3 || La Courneuve, France || Decision (unanimous) || 5 || 3:00
|-
! style="background:white" colspan=9 | 
|-  style="background:#cfc;"
| 2014-03-28 || Win ||align=left| Marco Piqué || Lion Fight 14 || Las Vegas, Nevada, USA || Decision (unanimous) || 5 || 3:00
|- style="background:#cfc;"
| 2013-05-05 || Win ||align=left| Luis Reis || ||  ||  ||  ||
|-
! style="background:white" colspan=9 | 
|- style="background:#cfc;"
| 2013-03-09 || Win ||align=left| Gil Silva || Le Choc des Légendes 2013 || Paris, France || Decision || 5 || 3:00
|- style="background:#fbb;"
| 2013-01-25 || Loss ||align=left| Yodsanklai Fairtex || Lion Fight 8 || Las Vegas, Nevada, USA || KO (punches) || 3 || 2:40
|- style="background:#cfc;"
| 2012-10-13 || Win ||align=left| Joe Valtellini || Lion Fight 7 || Las Vegas, Nevada, USA || Decision || 5 || 3:00
|- style="background:#cfc;"
| 2012-04-21 || Win ||align=left| Mohamed Abdellahim || La Nuit des Combattants 2 || Persan, France || TKO || 1 ||
|- style="background:#cfc;"
| 2012-03-24 || Win ||align=left| Chris Ngimbi || Thaiboxing Showtime 3 || Hazebrouck, France || Decision (Unanimous) || 3 || 3:00
|- style="background:#cfc;"
| 2011-05-14 || Win ||align=left| Chaz Mulkey || Battle in the Desert 5 || Las Vegas, NV, USA || Decision (Unanimous) || 5 || 3:00
|- style="background:#fbb;"
| 2011-12-07 || Loss ||align=left| Yohan Lidon || A1 WCC Lyon || Lyon, France || TKO (Doctor Stoppage) || 4 ||
|-
! style="background:white" colspan=9 | 
|- style="background:#fbb;"
| 2011-11-12 || Loss ||align=left| Abdallah Mabel || La 18ème Nuit des Champions || Marseille, France || Decision || 5 || 3:00
|-
! style="background:white" colspan=9 | 
|- style="background:#cfc;"
| 2011-09-10 || Win ||align=left| Dave Zuniga || Canadian Fighting Championship 7 || Winnipeg, Canada || TKO || 2 ||
|-
! style="background:white" colspan=9 | 
|- style="background:#fbb;"
| 2011-05-14 || Loss ||align=left| Ky Hollenbeck || Battle in the Desert 2 || Primm, NV, USA || Decision (Unanimous) || 5 || 3:00
|-
! style="background:white" colspan=9 | 
|- style="background:#cfc;"
| 2011-01-07 || Win ||align=left| Rachid Boumalek || Fight in Spirit || Epernay, France || KO || 3 ||
|- style="background:#cfc;"
| 2010-06-10 || Win ||align=left| Jonathan Camara || Ultimate Thai 5 || Paris, France || Decision (Unanimous) || 5 || 3:00
|- style="background:#cfc;"
| 2010-04-24 || Win ||align=left| Moussa Konaté || Fight Zone 4 || Villeurbanne, France || Decision (Unanimous) || 5 || 3:00
|- style="background:#fbb;"
| 2009-08-29 || Loss ||align=left| Dmitry Shakuta || It's Showtime 2009 Budapest || Budapest, Hungary || Decision || 5 || 3:00
|-
! style="background:white" colspan=9 | 
|- style="background:#cfc;"
| 2009-03-14 || Win ||align=left| Franco Lazarro || Oktagon presents: It's Showtime 2009 || Milan, Italy || Decision (Unanimous) || 3 || 3:00
|- style="background:#cfc;"
| 2008-12-06 || Win ||align=left| Cédric Muller || Le Choc Des Légendes III || Paris, France || TKO (Cut) || 3 ||
|- style="background:#cfc;"
| 2008-09-06 || Win ||align=left| William Etzler || It's Showtime 2008 Alkmaar || Alkmaar, Netherlands || TKO (Ref Stop/3 Knockdowns) || 1 ||
|- style="background:#cfc;"
| 2008-06-07 || Win ||align=left| Yohan Lidon || La Nuit des Challenges 5 || Lyon, France || Decision (Unanimous) || 5 || 3:00
|- style="background:#fbb;"
| 2008-04-? || Loss ||align=left| Cosmo Alexandre || It's Showtime Reality Show '08, Semi Final || Koh Samui, Thailand || Ext.R KO (Knee) || 4 ||
|- style="background:#fbb;"
| 2008-03-15 || Loss ||align=left| Dmitry Shakuta || It's Showtime Trophy Final '08, Final || 's-Hertogenbosch, Netherlands || Decision || 3 || 3:00
|-
! style="background:white" colspan=9 | 
|- style="background:#cfc;"
| 2008-03-15 || Win ||align=left| Mohammed Rahhaoui || It's Showtime Trophy Final '08, Semi Final || 's-Hertogenbosch, Netherlands || Decision || 3 || 3:00
|- style="background:#cfc;"
| 2008-03-15 || Win ||align=left| Alviar Lima || It's Showtime Trophy Final '08, Quarter Final || 's-Hertogenbosch, Netherlands || Decision (Unanimous) || 3 || 3:00
|- style="background:#cfc;"
| 2007-06-30 || Win ||align=left| Jan de Keyzer || W.F.C.A. Gala || Santander, Spain || Decision || 5 || 3:00
|-
! style="background:white" colspan=9 | 
|- style="background:#fbb;"
| 2007-03-24 || Loss ||align=left| Mohammed Rahhaoui || Fights at the Border V, Elimination Fight || Lommel, Belgium || Decision || 3 || 3:00
|-
! style="background:white" colspan=9 | 
|- style="background:#cfc;"
| 2006-04-15 || Win ||align=left| Vincent Vielvoye || East Side 5 || Gorinchem, Netherlands || TKO || 4 ||
|-
! style="background:white" colspan=9 | 
|- style="background:#cfc;"
| 2006-02-18 || Win ||align=left| Vincent Vielvoye || It's Showtime 2006 Belgium, Super Fight || Mortsel, Belgium || Decision || 5 || 3:00
|- style="background:#cfc;"
| 2005-10-22 || Win ||align=left| Yohan Lidon || La Nuit des Superfights II || Villebon, France || Decision (Unanimous) || 5 || 3:00
|- style="background:#cfc;"
| 2005-05-07 || Win ||align=left| Frank Nadje || La Nuit des Superfights || Villebon, France || Decision (Unanimous) || 5 || 3:00
|- style="background:#fbb;"
| 2002-11-30 || Loss ||align=left| Cico Zerbini || Kickboxing Mondiale 3 || Padova, Italy || Decision || 5 || 2:00
|-
| colspan=9 | Legend:

Amateur kickboxing record

|- style="background:#fbb;"
| 2006-11-10 || Loss ||align=left| Dimitry Kirpan || I.F.M.A. Muaythai World Championships '04, Semi Final -75 kg || Bangkok, Thailand || Decision || 4 || 2:00
|-
! style="background:white" colspan=9 | 
|- style="background:#cfc;"
| 2006-11-08 || Win ||align=left| Kazimbek || I.F.M.A. Muaythai World Championships '04, Quarter Final -75 kg || Bangkok, Thailand || Decision || 4 || 2:00
|-
| colspan=9 | Legend:

See also 
List of male kickboxers
List of It's Showtime events
List of It's Showtime champions

References

External links
Gregory Choplin | Facebook
DEREK boxing | Facebook

1980 births
Living people
French male kickboxers
Middleweight kickboxers
French Muay Thai practitioners
French sportspeople of Ivorian descent
Sportspeople from Saint-Denis, Seine-Saint-Denis